Gymnoscelis desiderata is a moth in the family Geometridae. It was described by Louis Beethoven Prout in 1927. It is found on São Tomé.

Subspecies
Gymnoscelis desiderata desiderata
Gymnoscelis desiderata austerula (Prout, 1937)
Gymnoscelis desiderata occidentalis Herbulot, 1988

References

Moths described in 1927
desiderata